The Lisnău is a left tributary of the Râul Negru in Romania. It flows into the Râul Negru near Lunca Ozunului.

References

Rivers of Romania
Rivers of Covasna County